Reversibility can refer to:
 Time reversibility, a property of some mathematical or physical processes and systems for which time-reversed dynamics are well defined
 Reversible diffusion, an example of a reversible stochastic process
 Reversible process (thermodynamics), a process or cycle such that the net change at each stage in the combined entropy of the system and its surroundings is zero
 Reversible reaction, a chemical reaction for which the position of the chemical equilibrium is very sensitive to the imposed physical conditions; so the reaction can be made to run either forwards or in reverse by changing those conditions
 Reversible computing, logical reversibility of a computation; a computational step for which a well-defined inverse exists
 Reversible error, a legal mistake invalidating a trial
 Reversible garment, a garment that can be worn two ways
 Piaget's theory of cognitive development, in which mental reversibility is part of the concrete operational stage, the understanding that numbers and objects can change and then return to their original state
 Reversible playing card, a playing card that may be read either way up